The Kaohsiung Museum of Labor is a museum about labor in Cianjin District, Kaohsiung, Taiwan.

History

The museum was originally officially opened in conjunction with the International Workers' Day on 1 May 2010 in Pier-2 Art Center. However, the soft opening was earlier, on 26 December 2009. In 2015, the museum was relocated from Yancheng to Cianjin District and was reopened on 25 July the same year. During the opening ceremony, various events and displays were held, such as retro marketplace and storytelling.

Exhibitions
The museum features the evolution of the labor force in the city, Taiwan's labor movement and the recent animation, comics and video games sectors.

Transportation
The museum is accessible within walking distance west from City Council Station of the Kaohsiung MRT.

See also
 List of museums in Taiwan

References

External links

 

2010 establishments in Taiwan
Museums established in 2010
History museums in Taiwan
Industry museums in Taiwan
Labor in Taiwan
Labor history
Museums in Kaohsiung
Relocated buildings and structures in Taiwan